Daniel Grillfors (born July 2, 1982) is a Swedish former professional ice hockey defenceman and current assistant coach to Mora IK of the HockeyAllsvenskan (Allsv).

Grillfors played in the Swedish Hockey League with HV71, Linköpings HC and Mora IK. He also played in the Swiss National League for SC Bern and in the Finnish Liiga for HIFK.

He concluded his playing career with Mora IK in the 2018–19 season, announcing his retirement due to injury, he immediately accepted an assistant coaching role to continue with Mora IK in the Allsvenskan on 24 May 2019.

Career statistics

References

External links

1982 births
HIFK (ice hockey) players
HV71 players
Linköping HC players
Living people
Mora IK players
People from Enköping
SC Bern players
Swedish ice hockey defencemen
VIK Västerås HK players
Sportspeople from Uppsala County